The Konzertgesellschaft München is a non-profit association dedicated to the cultivation and promotion of classical music and, since 2017, jazz.

Through the international singing competition Vokal genial, which took place annually alternating with the August Everding Music Competition for Instrumentalists, the Konzertgesellschaft München and its members have paved the way for more than 100 artists to pursue an international career over the past 30 years. In 1999, the Konzertgesellschaft München was awarded the Europäischen Kulturpreis in recognition of its merits.

In addition, the association, in accordance with its statutes, promotes highly talented musicians, awards promotional prizes, promotes the international exchange of artists, cultivates classical and modern contemporary music and supports the Münchener Bach-Tradition as well as music projects that could not be realized without patronage.

In this way, the Konzertgesellschaft München makes a targeted contribution to the cultural diversity of Munich and Bavaria as a music location.

History 
The association was founded in 1986 following the example of the Mozarteum Argentino, a music foundation in Argentina founded in 1952, which contributes significantly to the musical life of its country. The initiators of the foundation were the art historian Johann Georg Prince of Hohenzollern and the cultural manager Helmut Pauli.

Bodies 
The organizational bodies of the Konzertgesellschaft München are the General Assembly, the Presidium, the Board of Trustees and the Artistic Advisory Board. Each member is entitled to vote and can make suggestions at the General Assembly of Members and participate in decisions on amendments to the Statutes, election and discharge of the Presidium. The Presidium, to which the Board of Trustees and the Artistic Advisory Board are assigned in an advisory and supporting capacity, works on a voluntary basis.

Presidium 
The Presidium consists of Karl Friedrich von Hohenzollern (President), Désirée von Bohlen und Halbach (Vice-President) as well as Konstanze Wiedemann, Conrado Dornier, Norbert Roos and Jens Spaniol.

Board of Trustees 
The Board of Trustees is made up of public and cultural figures who are active promoters of music in public. It advises and supports the Board of Trustees in the implementation of its objectives. For this purpose, it is appointed by the Presidium for a period of five years.

Support for the highly gifted: competitions and prize winners 
Together with the organization of renowned music competitions, the promotion of the highly gifted is one of the central promotional concerns of the Konzertgesellschaft München. These included the August-Everding Music Competition initiated by August Everding and the International Vocal Competition Vokal genial, which have been held annually since 1987.

 1987: Michael Martin Kofler (flute)
 1988: Izabella Labuda, Isabelle Faust (Violin), Trio Wanderer
 1989: Arcis Quintett mit Albrecht Mayer (Oboe)
 1990: Juliane Banse (Soprano), Angelika Merkle (Piano), Alfredo Perl (Piano)
 1991: Violin: Anna Kandinskaja, Sonja Korkeala, Natalia Christina Steurer
 1992: Piano: Ragna Schirmer, Gloria d'Atri
 1993: Marianna Tarasova, Simone Nold, Markus Hollop, Juanita Lascarro (Vocals), Marcus Kretzer (Piano)
 1994: Jens Plücker, Ursula Petith, Johannes Kaltenbrunner (Horn), Leonid Korkin, Robert Hofmann (Trumpet)
 1995: Violoncello: Wolfgang Emanuel Schmidt, Nikolaus Popa, Kirill Kravtzov
 1996: Harp: Xavier de Maistre, Charlotte Balzereit, Jana Bousková
 1997: Lyric Tenor: Lars Lettner, Alfred Bøe, Hubert Nettinger, In-Hak Lee
 1998: String quartet: ConTempo String Quartet, Klenke Quartet Weimar, Casal Quartet, Modus Quartet
 1999: Oboe: Clara Dent, Susanne Hennicke, Kai Rapsch
 2000: Piano: Tobias Stork, Jean Muller, Christian Chamorel
 2001: Piano trio: Zurich Piano trio, Trio Ondine, Eurus-Trio
 2002: Violin: Andrej Bielow, Lena Neudauer, Daniel Röhn
 2003: Historical performance practice: Mo Yi und Chia-hsuan Tsai, Leila Schayegh und Gerd Amelung, Duo Seraphim
 2004: Das deutsche Lied: Colin Balzer, Christina Landshamer and Stefanie Irányi
 2005: Clarinet: Christopher Corbett, AntonioDuca, Daniel Ottensamer
 2006: Piano: Alexej Gorlatch, Dudana Mazmanishvili, Jean Muller
 2007: Vokal genial: Julia Hajmóczy, Ai Ichihara, Melissa Shippen
 2008: Organ: Michael Schöch, Matthias Egger, Balthasar Baumgartner
 2009: Vokal genial: Joo Hee Jung, Hyo Jung Kim, JunHo You
 2010: Hendrik Blumenroth (Violoncello), Wen Xiao Zheng (Viola), Felix K. Weber (Violin)
 2011: Vokal genial: Abigail Mitchell, Catalina Bertucci, Ilya Silchukov
 2012: Flute: Mikhail Khvostikov, Elise Gastaldi, Mark Xiao
 2013: Vokal genial: Camille Schnoor, Dae Hyun Ahn, Joshua Stewart
 2014: String quartet: Aris Quartett, Abel Quartet, Goldmund Quartett
 2015: Vokal genial: Vera-Lotte Böcker, Sangmin Jeon, Jiyoung Angela Shin
 2016: Percussion: Vanessa Porter, Hye-ji Bak, Tomi Emilov
 2019: Jazz: Sam Hylton
 2020: Vocal: Katja Maderer, Jonas Maximilian Müller
 2021: Jazz: Enkhjargal Erkhembayar

Award 
 1999 Awarded the European Cultural Prize of the Stiftung Pro Europa in recognition of the promotion of historical performance practice in music.

References

External links 
Official website

Patrons of the arts
Music competitions in Germany
Culture in Munich
Awards established in 1986